The Bollingen Foundation was an educational foundation set up along the lines of a university press in 1945. It was named after Bollingen Tower, Carl Jung's country home in Bollingen, Switzerland. Funding was provided by Paul Mellon and his wife Mary Conover Mellon. The Foundation became inactive in 1968, and its publications were later re-issued by Princeton University Press.

History

Initially the foundation was dedicated to the dissemination of Jung's work, which was a particular interest of Mary Conover Mellon. The Bollingen Series of books that it sponsored now includes more than 250 related volumes. The Bollingen Foundation also awarded more than 300 fellowships.  These fellowships were an important, continuing source of funding for poets like Alexis Leger and Marianne Moore, scholars like Károly Kerényi and Mircea Eliade, artists like Isamu Noguchi, among many others. The Foundation also sponsored the A. W. Mellon lectures at the National Gallery of Art.

In 1948, the foundation donated $10,000 to the Library of Congress to be used toward a $1,000 Bollingen Prize for the best poetry each year.  The Library of Congress fellows, who in that year included T. S. Eliot, W. H. Auden and Conrad Aiken, gave the 1949 prize to Ezra Pound for his 1948 Pisan Cantos. Their choice was highly controversial, in particular because of Pound's fascist and anti-Semitic politics. Following the publication of two highly negative articles by Robert Hillyer in the Saturday Review of Literature, the United States Congress passed a resolution that effectively discontinued the involvement of the Library of Congress with the prize. The remaining funds were returned to the Foundation. In 1950, the Bollingen Prize was continued under the auspices of the Yale University Library, which awarded the 1950 prize to Wallace Stevens.

In 1968, the Foundation became inactive. It was largely subsumed into the Andrew W. Mellon Foundation, which continued funding of the Bollingen Prize. The Bollingen Series was given to Princeton University Press to carry on and complete. Over its lifetime, the Bollingen Foundation had expended about $20 million. Thomas Bender has written,

Bollingen Series
A great many texts that were issued in the original Pantheon Books version of the Bollingen Series and in early editions by Princeton University Press are now out of print.  The Princeton Press site does not provide a comprehensive list, and is missing some of the key texts in the series and some of the grandest in vision, e.g. The Egyptian Religious Texts series.  A list of the works in the series, complete to 1982, appears as an appendix to William McGuire's book, pp. 295–309. The list below is based on McGuire's list and information appearing in the individual volumes, with help from the Princeton site and from The Library Congress Online Catalog.

Numbers 1 to 34

Number 35: The A. W. Mellon Lectures in the Fine Arts
This is the only part of the Bollingen Series that continues to produce new volumes.

Numbers 36 to 100

See also
 Bollingen Prize
 Bollingen Tower
 Philemon Foundation

References

External links
Bollingen Foundation Collection at the Library of Congress

Educational foundations in the United States
Series of books
Classics publications